Ruby Brooks (1861 – February 10, 1906) was an American banjoist, composer, and pioneer recording artist, sometimes called "King of Banjoists."  He was influential on later banjo players such as Fred Van Eps.

Biography
Reuben R. Brooks was born in Stamford, CT in 1861.  He taught himself to play the banjo, receiving no formal instruction.  He became famous in 1887 when he performed and won at that year's banjo "Championship of the World" held in Chickering Hall, New York City.  There he met and formed a partnership with the runner-up, Harry M. Denton.

Brooks and Denton
They formed the "Brooks & Denton Publishing Co." and citing "of Brooks and Denton" even on his solo recordings.

Performances
He gave concerts (often at Chickering Hall) and played in society programs regularly beginning in the late 1880s, performing in many varieties ranging from the latest vaudeville tunes to attempts at serious classical music. He repeated as champion at Chickering Hall in 1888 and 1889. He made three separate European tours, performing for various royalty including the Prince of Wales (the future King Edward VII), who was also a banjo player of some skill.  By the late 1890s he had mostly ceased to perform in public, finding it more lucrative to give private lessons to wealthy students and to make recordings for the developing phonograph industry.  Mr. Brooks recorded regularly for Edison from the late 1890s until his death in New York City in 1906 of throat cancer.

Reception
He is considered by Kaufman and Winans to be inferior to that player, as well as his contemporaries Vess Ossman and Olly Oakley.

Partial list of compositions
 "The Belle of Columbia"
 "Honor Bright"
 "University March"
 "White Star Line"

Partial discography
Columbia Records
 254 – The Mosquito Parade (1901)
 255 – Tell Me Pretty Maiden from "Florodora" (1901) 
 289 – Valse Bleue (1901)
 293 – Senegambian (1901)

Edison Records
 2605 – Darkies Dream
 2606 – Darkey Tickle
 2608 – Darkies Patrol
 2617 – In Old Madrid (re-made 1902)
 2632 – The Stars and Stripes Forever March (re-made 1902) 

Zonophone Records
 1826 (7") – Tell Me Pretty Maiden from "Florodora" (1902) 
 P813 (9") – Tell Me Pretty Maiden from "Florodora" (1902)

References

External links
Ruby Brooks recordings at the Discography of American Historical Recordings.

1861 births
1906 deaths
Edison Records artists
Columbia Records artists
Zonophone Records artists
American banjoists
Musicians from Stamford, Connecticut
Deaths from cancer in New York (state)
Deaths from esophageal cancer
Pioneer recording artists